Melvyn Francis Courtney (born 2 October 1943) is a Nelson City Councillor and a former Labour then Independent Member of Parliament for Nelson, in the South Island of New Zealand.

Early life and family
Courtney was born in Christchurch on 2 October 1943, the son of Clifford Francis and Joyce Elizabeth Courtney. He grew up in the suburb of Spreydon, and was educated at Christchurch Technical College.

His family wished to get a state house, but faced constant rejection from state housing officials. They went to local MP Mabel Howard who helped them to be accepted. His father had problems with alcohol and eventually left the family. As a 14-year old he got an after-school job at a grocery store eventually leaving school at 16 to work at the store full time before shifting to work at a supermarket.

He studied business administration and trained in the grocery industry in Christchurch. In 1968, Courtney married his wife, Wendy, and the couple went on to have three children. His family moved from Christchurch to Nelson in 1970. He owned and operated Courtney Enterprises which, in the mid-1970s, owned two supermarkets and had fifty employees in Nelson.

Political career

Courtney was the vice-chairman of the  Labour Representation Committee and organised campaigns in the electorate for Mabel Howard and later Norman Kirk in the 1960s. He noticed firsthand Howard's cognitive decline stating: "She was past her best. She didn't know who I was. She kept thinking I was a newspaper reporter." As the  campaign began Howard was clearly ill and Courtney, as a member of her campaign committee, ensured she was assisted at public appearances. Howard had helped his family in their hour of need and he wanted to help her. He was a Labour candidate for the Christchurch City Council in 1968, but was not elected.

Courtney was an elected member of Nelson City Council for six years during the 1970s under mayor Roy McLennan; for some of that time, he was also a member of parliament. He had a three-year gap and then became a member of the city council for another three-year term under mayor Peter Malone.

Member of Parliament
When Nelson's MP Sir Stan Whitehead died in early 1976, Courtney stood for the Labour nomination in the subsequent by-election. The party head office in Wellington, as well as party leader Bill Rowling, favoured law professor Geoffrey Palmer, but as he had neither lived in the area for decades and had been a party member for less than two-years there was resistance to Palmer's nomination. A group of local party members threatened legal action over his membership tenure if he was nominated. To prevent a split in the membership Arthur Baysting, the secretary of the Nelson Labour Electorate Committee (LEC), pushed for Courtney to be selected believing him to be the most electable alternative to Palmer. Ultimately Courtney was chosen as Labour's candidate.

Courtney waged a local issues campaign and proved "an excellent choice" as a candidate. He stressed Nelson's needs as a community as the major theme of his campaign, which was managed by MPs Colin Moyle and Arthur Faulkner. Moyle, Faulkner and Labour leader Bill Rowling spoke at meetings in support of Courtney and defended him from attacks by National that he was the wrong choice of a candidate and that Palmer was more suitable, highlighting that Courtney had lived and worked in Nelson for the last six years while Palmer had not. Labour fought a strong campaign and not only retained the seat but increased their majority as well, the victory at the polls vindicated the decision of the Labour Party's selection committee.

Courtney represented the Nelson electorate from 1976 to 1981 and was opposition spokesman for horticulture and fisheries for five years. He was a recipient of both the Queen's Silver Jubilee Medal in 1977 for service to the community and the New Zealand 1990 Commemoration Medal in recognition of services to New Zealand.

The Labour Party suffered three defeats in the 1975, 1978 and 1981 general elections under the leadership of Bill Rowling. Courtney saw the momentum that had been gained under the prime ministership of the charismatic Labour leader Norman Kirk (1972–74) was being eroded and lost by Rowling. Courtney firmly believed that change was needed in the leadership in order to beat Robert Muldoon and the National Party. Rowling was not an effective counter to Muldoon: in Parliament Muldoon had the measure of Rowling and Rowling was perceived as weak in the media. Courtney has stated: "Rowling's handling of the Moyle 'affair' in 1977 by asking Colin Moyle to resign in response to Rob Muldoon's attacks in parliament was wrong." After Courtney's strong performance in the Nelson by-election in 1976 the 1978 Labour Party general election result was a "major disappointment" for Courtney.

In May 1979 he broke ranks with trade unions and publicly disagreed with a strike action by butchers. In August he openly contradicted Rowling (who held the neighbouring  electorate) by stating his support for a private jet-foil service across the Cook Strait. There was also increasing dissatisfaction among party locals with Courtney. The LEC chairman Ron Bingham and erstwhile backer Baysting felt he was becoming too close to business and employers, contrasting with their expectations of a Labour MP at the time.

In June 1980 Courtney was against the "Think Big" policy for the fishing industry. As the opposition convener of the fisheries sub-committee on production and marketing, he asserted "the policy is falling apart" expressing the view of many commercial fishers: "The industry expanded so rapidly it was overcapitalized with too many boats...the inshore fleet expanded and joint venture and duty free boats exerted further pressure" Commercial Fishing Magazine, June 1980 pg.5.

Independent
There was media speculation that Courtney might defect from Labour and join National or Social Credit instead due to increasing differences over direction. However, in July 1980, he reaffirmed his ties with Labour stating that his first instincts were to "...stay within and try to change things from there." But he did say he was prepared to stand aside from the Labour candidacy rather than give up on his strong views on moral issues and those affecting his constituency. In the December 1980 leadership vote of confidence Courtney voted against Rowling. Rowling clung onto the Labour leadership by one vote, his own.

In February 1981 Courtney announced that he had let his membership of the Labour Party (which was due in January) lapse. In March 1981 Courtney withdrew from the Labour Party caucus and sat in the New Zealand House of Representatives as an independent. Courtney's announcement of his independent candidacy for the 1981 general election was made only a few days before the 35th anniversary of the death of Harry Atmore, MP for Nelson from 1911 to 1946. Atmore had been the last independent MP to be elected to the New Zealand Parliament.

In August 1981 when the touring South Africa rugby team came to Nelson, Courtney as a city councillor alongside the mayor of Nelson Peter Malone, deputy mayor Pat Tindle, and fellow councillors including Malcolm Saunders amongst others attended the civic reception at the Rutherford Hotel.

1981 election
At the 1981 election supporters rallied around Courtney's independent campaign and, although defeated, it was by the very narrow margin of 698 votes. Courtney took 37.0 per cent of the total vote, 3.4 percentage points behind the Labour candidate, and nearly three times as many votes as the National candidate's share of the vote. This was the best result by an independent candidate in New Zealand elections in nearly 40 years with political scientists Stephen Levine and Alan McRobie commenting that the Nelson contest was 'what would have been the most dramatic election upset of the last 45 years'.

Return to local politics
Courtney came out of political retirement for the 2016 local elections. Of the 12 successful candidates, Courtney was elected with 6,743 votes. Courtney was re-elected with 8,601 votes in the 2019 local elections. He also stood unsuccessfully in the 2019 mayoral election, placing second to incumbent mayor Rachel Reese. In the 2022 local elections Courtney was elected in the Stoke-Tahunanui Ward achieving the election threshold on the first iteration of voting under the STV system.

Outside politics
Courtney owned and operated supermarkets in Nelson and at its peak, he had five of them. He retired to Australia in about 2000. He returned to live in Nelson in late 2014 or early 2015.

Notes

References

External links
  Mel Courtney's Political Papers. National Register of Archives and Manuscripts
 Radio New Zealand Interview 1981. Sound Archives
Submission on Electoral (Integrity) Amendment Bill 2018
 Nelson City Council Roll of Honour

1943 births
Living people
People from Nelson, New Zealand
Nelson City Councillors
Independent politicians in New Zealand
21st-century New Zealand politicians
Members of the New Zealand House of Representatives
Independent MPs of New Zealand
New Zealand social democrats
New Zealand Labour Party MPs
New Zealand MPs for South Island electorates
20th-century New Zealand politicians
New Zealand businesspeople in retailing
New Zealand businesspeople
People associated with the Cawthron Institute